A paiza or paizi or gerege (pāiza,  páizi) was a tablet carried by Mongol officials and envoys to signify certain privileges and authority. They enabled Mongol nobles and officials to demand goods and services from civilian populations.

Although only someone with a paiza was required to be supplied with mounts and served specified rations, those carrying military rarities used the yam even without a paiza. The officials and nobles of the Mongol Empire issued paizas unofficially and abused civilians. Therefore, Ögedei Khan (r. 1229–1241) prohibited the nobility from issuing paizas and jarliqs.

To attract foreign or overseas merchants and talents, the Great Khans gave them paiza exempting them from taxes and allowing them to use relay stations. Most of these merchants were business partners of the Mongols, known as ortoq. However, Möngke Khan (r. 1251–1259) limited notorious abuses and sent imperial investigators to supervise the business of the merchants who were sponsored by the Mongols. He prohibited them from using the imperial relay stations or yam (zam) and paizas.

Marco Polo, who visited the Yuan Dynasty during the reign of Kublai Khan (r. 1260–1294), left a good description of the paiza.

The Ilkhan Ghazan (r. 1295–1304) reformed the issuance of jarliqs, creating set forms and graded seals, ordering that all jarliqs be kept on file at court and canceling jarliqs older than 30 years and old paizas. He fashioned new paizas into two ranks, ordered that they bear the names of the bearers on them to prevent them from being transferred and required them to be relinquished at the end of the official's term.

Although paizas were popularized by the Mongols, they were not (contrary to common claim) a Mongol innovation. Similar such passports were already in use in northern China under the Liao dynasty, and their use was continued under subsequent kingdoms such as the Jin Dynasty and the Tangut kingdom of Xi-Xia. The Jin paiza had seven different ranks.

References

Mongol Empire